De Alchemia is an early collection of alchemical writings first published by Johannes Petreius in Nuremberg in 1541. A second edition was published in Frankfurt in 1550 by the printer Cyriacus Jacobus.

The full title reads: De Alchemia. Opuscula complura veterum philosophorum. Among the texts are the important alchemical works the Rosarium Philosophorum, presented with illustrations in the second edition (1550); the Summa Perfectionis of Pseudo-Geber; and the Tabula Smaragdina of Hermes Trismegistus.

The Rosarium Philosophorum is itself an alchemical collection, taking the form of a (florilegium), or a collection of citations of earlier alchemical authorities, among them Khalid ibn Yazid, Pseudo-Arnaldus of Villa Nova, Alphidius, and Pseudo-Lull) and which includes verses explaining the preparation of the Philosopher's stone accompanied by allegorical illustrations, which depict, for example, the union of the male and female principles. The collection is preserved in many manuscript copies and comes perhaps from the end of the fourteenth or the beginning of the fifteenth century (some even date it to the sixteenth century).

In the 1541 edition, Petraeus called for the printing of further alchemical texts. This started a period of publishing alchemical collections in large numbers, among them the Artis Auriferae, Verae alchemiae artisque metallicae, citra aenigmata, doctrina and culminating in the Theatrum Chemicum.

Contents of 1541 edition 
Geber (Pseudo-Geber). 
Geber. 
Geber. 
Geber. 
(Roger Bacon). 
(Richardus Anglicus). 
 
(Khalid ibn Yazid). 
 (Hermes Trimegistus). 
(Ortulanus).

Contents of 1550 edition 
Part 1:
 
 
 
(Pseudo-Avicenna). 
(Pseudo-Lull). 
 
 
(Pseudo-Lull). 
(Pseudo-Aristotle). 

Part 2:

References

External links 
De Alchimia Opuscula Complura Veterum Philosophorum vol 1 digitized 2014 from the Bavarian State Library
De Alchimia Opuscula Complura Veterum Philosophorum vol 1 digitized 2007 from the Complutense University of Madrid
De Alchimia Opuscula Complura Veterum Philosophorum vol 1 digitized 2014 from the Lyon Public Library

Bibliography 
 Ferguson, John. Bibliotheca Chemica, vol. 1. Glasgow, 1906.

Alchemical documents